The 2022–23 Utah Runnin' Utes men's basketball team will represent the University of Utah during the 2022–23 NCAA Division I men's basketball season. The team is led by second-year head coach Craig Smith. They played their home games at the Jon M. Huntsman Center in Salt Lake City, Utah as members of the Pac-12 Conference.

Previous season
The Utes finished the 2021–22 season 11–20, 4–16 in Pac-12 play to finish in 11th place. They lost in the first round of the Pac-12 tournament to Washington.

Offseason

Departures

Incoming transfers

Recruiting classes

2022 recruiting class

Roster

Schedule and results 

|-
!colspan=12 style=|Exhibition

|-
!colspan=12 style=|Regular season

|-
!colspan=12 style=| Pac-12 tournament

Source:

References

2022–23 Pac-12 Conference men's basketball season
2020-21 team
Utah Utes
Utah Utes